Helle Trevino (née Nielsen) is a Danish–American professional female bodybuilder and the title winner of the 2017 and the 2019 Rising Phoenix World Championships.

Early life and education
Helle Trevino (born Helle Nielsen) was born and raised in rural Sønderborg, Denmark. She grew up on a farm. She majored in English and German in college. After that she continued her way into the fitness industry where she took a number of exams within the nutrition & training field.

Bodybuilding career

Amateur
Trevino was a gymnast from the age of 3 and competed in various other sports, including ballroom dancing, swimming, track and field, shot put, martial arts, horse-riding, boxing, biking, ballet and yoga.. When Trevino was 17 she joined a gym and started training seven days a week. She said on her Web site that she quickly realized she had great genetics for bodybuilding.

She later started competing. She attended the Danish Championships in Herning. At the age of 22 she won in the heavyweight and overall categories at the Danish Nationals in 1998, her first show. She also won the overall and heavyweight title at the Scandinavian Championships in the same year. In 1999 she competed at the World Championships in Australia.

Professional

2003-2010
Trevino became the first professional female  bodybuilder from Denmark since Lisser Frost-Larsen, who had last competed in 1984. In her pro debut, she won the heavyweight and overall at the Jan Tana Classic. A few months later, she placed fifth in the heavyweights at the Ms. Olympia.

From 2011

After spending a few years building up her personal training business, Trevino in 2011 won the FIBO pro show and placed 11th at the 2011 Ms. Olympia. The following year she placed 12th in the Ms. Olympia competition, where. In 2012, she moved from Denmark to California, to train at the Gold's Gym in Venice.

Contest history
 1998 Danish Championships – 1st (HW and Overall)
 1998 Scandinavian Championships – 1st (HW and Overall)
 1999 World Amateur Championships – 10st (HW)
 2003 IFBB Jan Tana Classic – 1st (HW and Overall)
 2003 IFBB Ms. Olympia – 5th (HW)
 2011 IFBB FIBO Power Pro Germany – 1st
 2011 IFBB Ms. Olympia – 14th
 2012 IFBB Europa Battle of Champions Hartford – 9th
 2012 IFBB WOS Chicago Pro-Am Extravaganza – 2nd
 2012 IFBB Ms. Olympia –12th
 2013 IFBB PBW Tampa Pro – 5th
 2014 IFBB Omaha Pro – 7th
 2015 IFBB WOS Chicago Pro – 1st
 2015 IFBB Pro League WOS Rising Phoenix Pro Women's Bodybuilding – 2nd
 2016 IFBB Pro League WOS Rising Phoenix Pro Women's Bodybuilding – 4th
 2017 IFBB Pro League WOS Rising Phoenix Pro Women's Bodybuilding – 1st
 2018 IFBB Pro League WOS Rising Phoenix Pro Women's Bodybuilding – 5th
 2019 Tampa Pro – 1st
 2019 IFBB Pro League WOS Rising Phoenix Pro Women's Bodybuilding – 1st
 2020 IFBB Pro League WOS Rising Phoenix Pro Women's Bodybuilding - 2nd
 2020 IFBB WOS Ms. Olympia - 3rd
 2021 IFBB Pro League WOS Rising Phoenix Pro Women's Bodybuilding - 2nd
 2021 IFBB WOS Ms. Olympia - 2nd

Personal life
, Trevino lived in Los Angeles, California and worked as a personal trainer in Venice, California. She speaks Danish, English, and German. She worked as a caretaker of disabled people for 15 years. In 2008, she became the CEO & Founder of the company Team Evolution.

See also
Female bodybuilding
List of female professional bodybuilders

References

External links

1975 births
Living people
People from Sønderborg Municipality
Danish expatriates in the United States
Danish female bodybuilders
People from Venice, Los Angeles
Professional bodybuilders
Sportspeople from California
Sportspeople from Los Angeles
Sportspeople from Los Angeles County, California